The Technical University of Crete (TUC; , Polytechneio Kritis) is a state university under the supervision of the Greek Ministry of Education and was founded in 1977 in Chania, Crete. The first students were admitted in 1984. The purpose of the institution is to conduct research, to provide under-graduate and graduate educational programs in modern engineering fields as well as to develop links with the Greek industry.
It is highly ranked among the Greek technical universities in terms of research productivity, research funding, scientific publications and citation per faculty member. It uses Daedalus as part of the emblem.

Academic structure 

The Technical University of Crete comprises five engineering schools, all of which offer undergraduate and postgraduate study programmes. The school of Electronic and Computer Engineering was renamed to School of Electrical and Computer Engineering in July 2016.

Research 

The Technical University of Crete is particularly active in conducting basic and applied research such as:

School of Production Engineering and Management, focused on Technology (and how to use it for Production) and in part how to manage said technology. (Computer Aided Manufacturing, Intelligent Technological Systems, Computer Aided Design, Robotics, Environmental Engineering and Management, Dynamic Systems and Simulation, Decision Support Systems, Data Analysis and Forecasting, Financial Engineering, Management Systems, Work Safety and Cognitive Ergonomics, Applied Socioeconomic Research),

School of Electrical and Computer Engineering, focused on Programming and how Electronics function. (Distributed Multimedia Information Systems and Applications, Intelligent Systems, Software Technology and Network Applications, Electronics, Electric Circuits and Renewable Energy Sources, Microprocessor and Hardware, Automation, Information and Networks, Telecommunications, Digital Image and Signal Processing),

School of Mineral Resources Engineering, focused on Geology and how to obtain minerals. (Applied Geology, Applied Geophysics, Applied Mineralogy, Petrology and Economic Geology, Geodesy and Geomatics, Rock Mechanics, Mine Design, Solid Fuels Beneficiation and Technology, Ore Processing.)

School of Environmental Engineering, focused on Sustainability. (Liquid and Solid Waste Management, Water Resources and Coastal Engineering, Sustainable Energy, Remediation Engineering, Air Pollution, Environmental Sciences), and

School of Architecture, focused on Art and Design. (Architectural Design, Urban design and Planning, Digital Technologies in Architectural Design, History and Theory of Architecture and Art, Landscape Architecture, Visual Arts, Restoration of Buildings).

Campus 
Library, IT & Communications Centre, cafeterias, sports facilities, and students' dormitories are located on campus.

Academic evaluation 

The Technical University of Crete is among the top Greek institution with the highest rate of research publications per faculty member.

In 2015 the external evaluation of the institution cited Technical University of Crete as Worthy of merit.

An external evaluation of all academic departments in Greek universities was recently conducted by the Hellenic Quality Assurance and Accreditation Agency (HQAA).

According to the Times Higher Education (THE) list of best Universities in the world for 2022, Technical University of Crete is among the top 1.000 in the world (place 801-1000) and among the top 600 (place 501-600) on the field of Engineering & Technology. 

According to the Center for World University Rankings (CWUR),Technical University of Crete is among the top 2.000 in the world (place 1.854)for 2022.

 Department of Chemical & Environmental Engineering (2011) 
 Department of Electrical & Computer Engineering (2011) 
 Department of Mineral Resources Engineering (2011) 
 Department of Production Engineering & Management (2012) 
 Department of Architecture (2013)

Partner universities
Within the framework of foreign strong international relations with universities from all over the world, TUC has signed Bilateral Cooperation Agreements with the following institutions:

 Georg-Simon-Ohm-Fachhochschule Nuremberg, Germany
 Fachhochschule Aachen, Germany
 Technical University of Ilmenau, Germany
 Freie Universität Berlin, Germany
 Universität Lüneburg, Germany
 Technische Universität Bergakademie Freiberg, Germany
 Technische Fachhochschule Berlin, Germany
 Université des Sciences et Technologies de Lille, France
 Université Paul Sabatier Toulouse III, France
 Università degli Studi di Trieste, Italy
 Università degli Studi di Catania, Italy
 Università degli Studi di Torino, Italy
 Università degli Studi di Bologna, Italy
 Universite de Liege, Belgium
 Universiteit Antwerpen, Belgium
 Universidad de Cantabria, Spain
 Universidad de Sevilla, Spain
 Universidad Politecnica de Catalunya, Spain
 Institute of Chemical Technology, Czech Republic
 Czech University of Agriculture in Prague, Czech Republic
 BRNO University of Technology, Prague, Czech Republic
 Charles University in Prague, Czech Republic
 Czech Technical University in Prague, Czech Republic
 University of Mining & Technology St Ivan Rilski, Bulgaria
 Technical University of Sofia, Bulgaria
 University of Chemical Technology
 University of Strathclyde, Glasgow, U.K
 National Technical University of Athens, Greece
 Montana Tech of the University of Montana, Butte, Montana, USA
 Middle East Technical University, Turkey
  University Of Southern Denmark, Faculty of Engineering, Denmark

Honorary doctorate degree awards
The Technical University of Crete has conferred the title Doctor Honoris causa to the following distinguished scientists:

5/5/1993. Rudolf Kalman, founder of the modern mathematical control theory, Emeritus Professor at the Swiss Federal Institute of Technology.
 3/5/1996. Sir David Cox, founder of Modern Statistics, Professor at the University of Oxford.
 2/12/1996. Michael Athans, founder of the self-adjusting control in the field of automation, Professor at M.I.T.
 26/5/2000. Kenneth R. Laker, founder of micro-electronics in the field of active filters of acoustics surface waves, Professor at the University of Pennsylvania.
 10/6/2002. Bernard Roy, founder of the European School of Multicriteria Decision Analysis, Emeritus Professor at the Universite Paris-Dauphine.
 15/12/2004. Mohammad Jamshidi, expert on modelling, control and applications of Large-scale complex systems, Regents Professor at the University of New Mexico.
 15/12/2004. Athanasios Fokas, expert on non-linear mathematical science, Professor at the University of Cambridge.
 4/3/2005. Laurent Lafforgue, outstanding contribution to Langlands program in the field of number theory and analysis, Permanent Professor at the Institute des hautes etudes scientifiques (IHES).
 1/2/2006. Eftychios Bitsakis, outstanding contribution to Theoretical Physics, Professor Emeritus at the University of Ioannina.
07/05/2006. Richard Lambert, expert on physical chemistry and surface science, Professor of the University of Cambridge.
01/09/2008, Pravin Varayia, Distinguished Professor of the Department of Electric & Computer Engineering of Berkeley University
01/09/2008. Professor David F. Olli, expert on photochemical and biochemical engineering, Distinguished Professor of the North Carolina State University
10/11/2008. Roman Slowinski, founder of the scientific school of «intelligent decision support systems», Professor at the Computer Science Institute of Poznan University of Technology
29/05/2009. Professor Dimitrios Bertsekas, McAfee Professor of Engineering at MIT, member of the United States National Academy of Engineering.
04/10/2012. His All Holiness the Ecumenical Patriarch Bartholomew, prominent figure with diverse social, humanitarian, environmental and spiritual work.
12/09/2012. Asad M. Madni, for contributions to development and commercialization of sensors and systems for aerospace and automotive safety, Distinguished Professor in the area of systems' design and signal processing, member of the US National Academy of Engineering. 
14/12/2012. Jaime-Gil Aluja, in Recognition of his Outstanding Contributions to the field of Decision Making in Uncertainty
5/12/2015, Emmanouil Michailakis, in recognition of his outstanding Contributions to the field of Medical Science and his valuable services to Greece and TUC, Doctor.
29/06/2017, George Tchobanoglous, in recognition of his outstanding Contributions to the field of Environmental Science and his valuable services to the Technical University of Crete 
30/08/2019, Rainer Stegmann, in recognition of his outstanding contribution to the promotion of research and technology worldwide in the field of Solid Waste Management.

Memberships 

The Technical University of Crete cooperate with universities and other organizations of higher learning and research. Within this framework, it has been a member of the European University Association since 1995 (E.U.A), a member of the Conference of European Engineering schools of Advanced Research (CESAER) since 2003.
CESAER, is a non-profit association of leading engineering universities in Europe. CESAER was set up on May 10, 1990, with headquarters in Leuven, Belgium. The main objectives are to provide high quality engineering education in Europe and to improve links between association members in research, as well as postgraduate and continuing education.

Members of CESAER

TUC is also a member of the Réseau Méditerranéen des Ecoles d'Ingénieurs (RMEI), a member of the Community of Mediterranean Universities (CMU) and a full partner of NEARCTIS (A Network of Excellence for Advanced Road Cooperative Traffic management in the Information Society). It is an academic network gathering the main teams working on the field of traffic management and optimisation, with a particular focus on cooperative systems for road traffic optimisation, but it covers a wide scope as it appears that cooperative systems have to be integrated into the whole traffic management systems. The full partners are:

 	Technische Universiteit Delft, Netherlands
 	Imperial College London, United Kingdom
 	University College London, United Kingdom
 	University of Southampton, United Kingdom
 	EPFL, 	Switzerland
 		Technical University of Crete, Greece
 Institut National de Recherche sur les Transports et leur Securite, France
 Europe Recherche Transport, France
 		Deutsches Zentrum für Luft- und Raumfahrt e.V., Germany

Mobility programs

SOCRATES is a programme funded by the European Union that covers all areas and levels of education. The section involving higher education is called Erasmus. Students can participate in this exchange programme by studying at a particular university in another European country for a short period. Study placements involve either attending classes at a host university. The Technical University of Crete, has signed many bilateral agreements with other universities. The number of the outgoing and incoming students is increasing, year after year, indicating that the programme is very successful.

See also
 List of universities in Greece
 Polytechnic (Greece)
 University of Crete
 Open access in Greece

References

External links 
 Technical University of Crete (TUC) - Official Website 
 Hellenic Quality Assurance and Accreditation Agency (HQAA) 
 Technical University of Crete Internal Quality Assurance Unit 
 Technical University of Crete Special Research Fund Account 
 Guide to Laboratories of the Technical University of Crete 
 Hellenic Quality Assurance and Accreditation Agency (HQAA)
 Department of Production Engineering and Management, HQAA Final Report, 2012 
 Department of Mineral Resources Engineering, HQAA Final Report, 2011 
 Department of Electrical and Computer Engineering, HQAA Final Report, 2011 
 Department of Environmental Engineering, HQAA Final Report, 2011 
 Department of Architecture, HQAA Final Report, 2013 
 DASTA Office (Career Office & Innovation Unit), HQAA Final Report, 2012 
 "ATHENA" Plan for Higher Education 
 Greek Research & Technology Network (GRNET) 
 okeanos (GRNET's cloud service) 
 synnefo - Open Source Cloud Software (GRNET) 

Universities in Greece
Technological educational institutions in Greece
Science and technology in Greece
Educational institutions established in 1977
Chania
Buildings and structures in Crete
1977 establishments in Greece